{{DISPLAYTITLE:C19H29NO}}
The molecular formula C19H29NO (molar mass: 287.44 g/mol, exact mass: 287.2249 u) may refer to:

 Cycrimine
 Gephyrotoxin, also known as Histrionicotoxin D

Molecular formulas